Hawally is an area in the Hawalli Governorate, located in the State of Kuwait.

Hawally is a large settlement and the commercial center for most computer-related goods in Kuwait. Prior to the first Gulf War, it housed many Palestinians, but many left during and after the War. Currently, Hawally is home to many of the Arab populations in Kuwait including Egyptians, Syrians, Iraqis and Lebanese. It is also home to many Asians including Filipinos, Indians, Nepalis, Bengalis and Pakistanis.

Ibn Khaldoun Street is one of its main streets.

History
The settlement was first established in the 7th century around fresh water wells that were dug during Al-Ala al-Hadhrami's time in what is now Kuwait and later officially became a city in 1906 during Al Sabah's rule. The settlement's name come from the Arabic phrase "الحلو لي " meaning "the fresh [water] for me".

Demographics
As of 2022 the population of Hawally is estimated to be 218,141.

Sport
Hawalli is home to Qadsia SC and Mohammed Al-Hamad Stadium, Its football stadium is one of the most famous in Kuwait and is a popular venue for many international matches that happen within the region. Also, Hawally holds its own theme park named Hawally Park. Near the Hawally Park resides the Muhallab mall.

Education

The American School of Kuwait is in Hawally.

The American International School of Kuwait is also located in Hawalli.

The New Pakistan International School is in Hawally.

The American Creativity Academy is in Hawally.

References

Suburbs of Kuwait City
Areas of Hawalli Governorate